Reinhold Senn (born in Imst on 6 December 1936) was an Austrian luger who competed during the 1960s.

Senn won the silver medal in the men's doubles event at the 1964 Winter Olympics in Innsbruck.

At the 1961 FIL World Luge Championships in Girenbad, Switzerland, Senn won bronze medals in the men's singles and men's doubles event. He won a silver medal in the men's doubles event at the 1967 FIL European Luge Championships in Königssee, West Germany.

References 
 
 
 
 
  

1936 births
Living people
Austrian male lugers
Olympic lugers of Austria
Olympic silver medalists for Austria
Lugers at the 1964 Winter Olympics
Olympic medalists in luge
Medalists at the 1964 Winter Olympics